"Swim" is a song by American rock band Fishbone from their album Give a Monkey a Brain and He'll Swear He's the Center of the Universe. The song is in a heavy metal style and was written by guitarist John Bigham.

Release and reception
Although the song did not chart in the US, it was included in the film Last Action Hero, the soundtrack of which reached number 7 on the billboard charts. It also had some minor success in the UK, where it peaked at number 54.

Music video
The music video of the song was directed by Rusty Cundieff and features the band performing in swimming gear in front of a crowd frolicking in a pool.

Track listing
 "Swim (Single Mix)" - 4:14
 "Swim (Ofishal Extended Remix)"  - 5:39
 "Swim (T. Ray H2O Mix)" - 4:59
 "Swim (JB Dub Mix)" - 6:15

Charts

References

Fishbone songs
1993 singles
Song recordings produced by Terry Date
1993 songs
Columbia Records singles